Krzysztof Morsztyn Jr. (c.1580 – 1642) of the Leliwa coat of arms, was a Polish nobleman, educator, starosta of Filipow, and starosta of Przewałka.

He was the son of Krzysztof Morsztyn Sr. (1522–1600), the founder of the Polish Brethren community in Filipow in 1585, and brother in law of Fausto Sozzini who had married his sister Elżbieta in 1586. His son was Seweryn Morsztyn (before 1604 – before 1668).

References

 Polish Biographical Dictionary (Polski Słownik Biograficzny) Vol. 21, p. 818.
  Hr. Seweryn Uruski: "Morsztynowie herbu Leliwa. Rodzina."  Herbarz szlachty polskiej Vol. 11, pp. 272–278.

1642 deaths
Polish Unitarians
Year of birth uncertain